Samiam (pronounced "sam-I-am") is an American punk rock band from Berkeley, California, active since 1988.

History

Samiam was formed in late 1988 after the breakup of the Gilman club mainstay Isocracy. Their first show was in January 1989 with Christ on Parade. They released records through New Red Archives and Hopeless Records in the US and Burning Heart Records in Europe. In the mid-'90s, the band had two releases on major labels, Atlantic Records in 1994 and Ignition/Tommy Boy in 1997. This path achieved modest mainstream success; a video for "Capsized" gained considerable airplay on MTV, they performed on The Jon Stewart Show in 1994 and the single "She Found You" garnered considerable radio play in 1998.

Over the years, Samiam has toured extensively throughout Europe, North America and Japan, and performed with bands like Bad Religion, Green Day, The Offspring, NOFX, No Doubt, Toadies, Sense Field, Blink-182, Deftones, 311, Millencolin, and Fishbone.

In early 2001, the band went on hiatus after supporting the Astray album. Despite what was initially to be a breakup, they continued to tour abroad yearly (Europe and South America) with occasional shows in New York City, San Francisco and Los Angeles. This led to the recording of the band's seventh album Whatever's Got You Down, which was released in 2006. Samiam toured Europe three more times in 2006 and 2007 and played various US dates in 2008. 

Samiam toured Australia in September 2009, together with the band A Death in the Family. This was followed by an appearance at The Fest in Gainesville, Florida in November 2009 and shows in Santiago, Chile; San Miguel, Argentina; and São Paulo, Brazil in December 2009. October 2010 brought them together again with A Death in the Family for a European and East Coast tour.

Samiam released Trips, their first album in five years, on September 6, 2011. Semi annual tours have followed ever since in Europe, Australia and South America. In 2015, while in Chicago for an appearance at Riot Fest, a four-song demo was recorded but never finished.

In December 2019, Samiam announced on their Facebook page that they are working on their first studio album in  years.

Musical style
Their musical style has been described as punk rock, pop-punk, and emo.

Members
Current members

 Jason Beebout (vocals) 
 Sergie Loobkoff (guitar) 
 Colin Brooks (drums) 
 Sean Kennerly (guitar/bass) 
 Chad Darby (bass)

Past members

 Ryan Sullivan (guitar, 1988–1989)
 Johnny Cruz (drums)
 James Brogan (guitar, 1988–2000) 
 Martin Brohm (bass, 1988–1993) 
 Aaron Rubin (bass, 1993–1997) 
 Jeremy Bergo (bass, 2006) 
 Mark Mortinsen (drums, 1988–1990/1993) 
 Dave Ayer (drums, 1990–1993) 
 Tré Cool (drums, 1999) 
 Scott McPherson (drums, 1999) 
 Victor Indrizzo (drums, 1993–1995) 
 Davey Latter (drums, 1999)
 Michael Petrak (drums, 1995–1999) 
 Charlie Walker (drums) 
 Billy Bouchard (bass)

Discography

Studio Albums

EPs and compilations

References

External links
Official Facebook page
Videos on YouTube.com
 Interview with Sergie Loobkoff on Scanner zine, 2010

Punk rock groups from California
Pop punk groups from California
Emo musical groups from California
Burning Heart Records artists
Musical groups from Berkeley, California
Musical groups established in 1988
Hopeless Records artists
Pure Noise Records artists